"Papa'z Song" is a song by American rapper 2Pac from his second solo album, Strictly 4 My N.I.G.G.A.Z... (1993). It was released as the fourth and final single from the album. A music video was made for the single. The song peaked at number twenty four on the US Hot Rap Songs chart, number eighty two on the US Hot R&B/Hip-Hop Songs chart and number eighty seven on the US Billboard Hot 100.

The song features Mopreme Shakur under the stage name Wycked in the song, Shakur's older stepbrother and son of Mutulu Shakur.

Music video
Both Tupac and Mopreme Shakur appear in the video. 
Actress Vivica A. Fox plays the mother in the music video's story. There are scenes of a husband and his wife arguing.  They also act in front of the jail cell. The music video was shot in 1993.

Track listing
 "Papa'z Song"
 "Dabastard's Remix"
 "Vibe Tribe Remix"
 "Peep Game" featuring Deadly Threat
 "Cradle to the Grave"

Charts

References

1993 songs
1994 singles
Tupac Shakur songs
Mopreme Shakur songs
Interscope Records singles
Songs about fathers
Songs written by Tupac Shakur